is the publishing arm of The Asahi Shimbun Company, publishing books, magazines, and manga. It replaced  on 1 April 2008 just after it went bankrupt.

History

Asahi Sonorama was created as a division of Asahi Shimbunsha on September 9, 1959, under the name "Asahi Sonopress". It was initially established to record interviews, news, crime scene investigations, and articles on a variety of topics, and then release them on tape and sonosheets in the audio recording magazine Asahi Sonorama (from whence the company got its name). While doing this, the company also began publishing other magazines, manga collections, and novels.

Even though the sound quality of sonosheets was lower than that of vinyl records, the sonosheets were flexible and could last a long time. Asahi Sonorama found a market among those who could not afford the high price of LP records and was therefore able to enter the record market and compete with record companies and publishers.

After a time, however, the magazine and the sonosheet started having different content, and sale started dropping, so the magazine began changing its area of specialty toward having more child-oriented music and content. As anime, manga, tokusatsu, TV dramas, and the like became more popular, the magazine became more of a digest or anthology of stories, theme songs, and pictures from these series. Because of this, people began purchasing the magazine as a gift for children and sales began to be brisk again. However, the various record companies and publishers began taking advantage of this popularity by publishing their own magazines and sonosheets.

In the 1960s, due to the huge rise in the number of television shows targeting children, there was also a huge rise in the amount of material to choose from for inclusion in Asahi Sonorama. Since all of them were drawing from the same sources, the Asahi Sonorama and its rivals would often release sonosheets and vinyl records at the same time. Asahi Sonorama (the company) began to move into the vinyl record market at this time. In 1966, the company's name was changed from "Asahi Sonopress" to "Asahi Sonorama".

Due to the flooding of the market with similar goods, many companies began going under in the 1970s because they couldn't maintain their production levels and still make a profit. Asahi Sonorama was able to improve their manufacturing technique for the sonosheets to the point where they could attach paper labels to them, calling them "punch sheets" instead of "sonosheets". They also improved the sound quality, allowing them to release anime and tokusatsu picture books with the included punch sheet in stereo instead of mono sound. In 1975, Asahi Sonorama established its "Sonorama Bunko" imprint, and in September that same year began publication of the magazine Manga Shōnen.

Unfortunately, the market for picture books with included records disappeared quickly in the 1980s, so they refocused their attention on the regular publishing business.

Between June 21, 2007, and September 30 of the same year, Asahi Sonorama went through bankruptcy liquidation proceedings. The trademarks for "Sonosheet" and "Asahi Sonorama" were passed to their parent company, Asahi Shimbunsha (publisher of the Asahi Shimbun), and publication rights were handled by the publication division of that company. On April 1, 2008, Asahi Shimbunsha spun off its publication division into a subsidiary company, Asahi Shimbun Publications, and Asahi Sonorama is now considered a division of that company.

Publications
, a monthly manga magazine
, a monthly manga magazine
 referred to as  through issue three.
, a celebrity magazine focusing on young male actors. Beginning with volume 5,  became the sales agency for the magazine.
, a monthly manga magazine
 , a tokusatsu media coverage magazine
, a horror story and manga magazine
, a formerly published humor story and manga magazine which ceased publication in 2008

, a photography magazine
, a monthly shōnen manga magazine
Monthly Halloween, a monthly horror manga magazine
, a "weird tales" josei manga magazine, originally titled 
, a special quarterly issue of Nemuki
, a science fiction and fantasy novel magazine. There were 74 issues from early Summer 1985 through May 1992.
, a quarterly science fiction and fantasy novel magazine. As the continuation of Shishiō, there were seven issues from November 1992 through May 1994. It published novels by authors such as Shinji Kajio, Yūichi Sasamoto, and Hideyuki Kikuchi, and manga by artists such as Yoshitō Asari and Yukinobu Hoshino (2001 Nights). In the 1994 Spring issue, the publishers included a message stating that the magazine would be ceasing publication within the year, and there haven't been any issues since then. It is assumed the magazine has ceased publication.
, a science fiction special effects magazine which ceased publication with the July 2005 issue. Hobby Japan acquired the rights to the publication in 2007, and the magazine began publication again in 2008.

Sources:

Imprints

Novels
Asahi Sonorama

Manga
Halloween Comics
Halloween Shōjo Comic Kan
Honto ni Atta Kowai Hanashi Comics
Izumi Takemoto dashinaoshi
Nemurenu Yoru no Kimyō na Hanashi Comics
Sonorama Comic Bunko
Sun Comics
Sun Wide Comics

References

Notes

External links
Official site

Asahi Shimbun Company
Book publishing companies in Tokyo
Comic book publishing companies in Tokyo
Magazine publishing companies in Tokyo
Publishing companies established in 1959
Visual arts publishing companies
1959 establishments in Japan